Michal Dočolomanský (25 March 1942 in Niedzica – 26 August 2008 in Bratislava) was a Slovak actor and singer. He appeared in more than forty films between 1962 and 2007.

Filmography

External links 
 

Slovak male film actors
Slovak male stage actors
Slovak male television actors
20th-century Slovak male actors
Slovak people of Romanian descent
1942 births
2008 deaths
People from Nowy Targ County
Slovak television presenters